Humanist Democratic Centre (CDH) was a Christian democratic and centrist French-speaking political party in Belgium. The party originated in the split in 1972 of the unitary Christian Social Party (PSC-CVP) which had been the country's governing party for much of the post-war period. It continued to be called the Christian Social Party (PSC) until 2002 when it was renamed the Humanist Democratic Centre. It was refounded as Les Engagés in 2022.

History 
The PSC was officially founded in 1972. The foundation was the result of the split of the unitary Christian Social Party (PSC-CVP) into the Dutch-speaking Christian People's Party (CVP) and the French-speaking Christian Social Party (PSC), following the increased linguistic tensions after the crisis at the Catholic University of Leuven in 1968. A similar split already happened in 1936 when the Catholic Bloc split into the dutchophone Catholic Flemish People's Party and francophone Catholic Social Party. The PSC performed particularly badly in the 1999 general election. This was linked to several scandals, such as the escape of Marc Dutroux and the discovery of dioxine in chickens (the PSC was a coalition partner in the Dehaene government). The decline in votes was also explained by declining adherence to Catholicism. The party was confined to opposition on all levels of government.

The party started a process of internal reform. In 2001 a new charter of principles, the "Charter of Democratic Humanism," was adopted and in 2002 the party adopted a new constitution and a new name, Humanist Democratic Centre.

In the 2003 general election the party did not perform much better and was still confined to opposition. After the 2004 regional elections the party returned to power in Brussels, in Walloon Region and the French Community together with the Socialist Party and Ecolo in Brussels, and with the Socialist Party in Walloon Region and the French Community.

In the 2007 general elections, the party won 10 out of 150 seats in the Chamber of Representatives and two out of 40 seats in the Senate.

In the 2010 general elections, the party lost one seat in the Chamber and kept its two seats in the Senate, a result which was repeated in the 2014 general elections. In the 2019 general elections the party registered its worst ever performance, winning only 5 seats and 3.7% of the vote, as well as its worst performance in the Walloon and Brussels parliaments as part of the general trend of Belgians turning away from the traditional political parties.

Ideology
Its ideology was "democratic humanism, inspired by personalism inherited notably from Christian humanism" which includes a centre-left policy towards the economy, supporting state interventionism and calling for the unity of Belgium, while also containing a centre-right faction on social issues and supporting tougher measures on crime. Presently, the party considers itself to be a movement rather than a party, and calls for citizen-led initiatives and more engagement between the public and politicians.

Presidents
CVP/PSC
1945–1947 August De Schryver
1949–1950 François-Xavier van der Straten-Waillet
1950–1961 Théo Lefèvre
1961–1966 Paul Vanden Boeynants
1966–1972 Robert J. Houben

PSC
1972–1976 Charles-Ferdinand Nothomb
1976–1977 Georges Gramme
1977–1979 Charles-Ferdinand Nothomb
1979–1981 Paul Vanden Boeynants
1981–1996 Gérard Deprez
1996–1998 Charles-Ferdinand Nothomb
1998–1999 Philippe Maystadt
1999–2002 Joëlle Milquet

cdH
2002–2011 Joëlle Milquet
2011–2019 Benoît Lutgen
2019–2022 Maxime Prévot

Until 1968 this lists gives the president of the Walloon part of the unitary CVP/PSC.
The party changed its name from PSC to cdH on 18 May 2002.

Electoral results

Chamber of Representatives
Results for the Chamber of Representatives, in percentages for the Kingdom of Belgium.

Senate

Regional

Brussels Parliament

Walloon Parliament

European Parliament

Further reading

References

External links 

 Official Website
 cdH students
 cdH page on the website of the European People's Party

Francophone political parties in Belgium
Christian democratic parties in Belgium
Political parties established in 1968
Political parties established in 1972
Political parties established in 2002
Political parties disestablished in 2022
1968 establishments in Belgium
1972 establishments in Belgium
2002 establishments in Belgium
2022 disestablishments in Belgium
Member parties of the European People's Party